Oliver VII is a 1942 novel by Antal Szerb. The first English translation was published in 2007. In the book, the restless ruler of an obscure central European state plots a coup d'état against himself and escapes to Venice in search of ‘real’ experience. There he falls in with a team of con men and ends up, to his own surprise, impersonating himself. His journey through successive levels of illusion and reality teaches him much about the world, about his own nature and the paradoxes of the human condition.

External links

PushkinPress.com English editions of works by the author Antal Szerb
Financial Times Review by Alberto Manguel
 Review in The Guardian
 Review by Complete Review

1942 novels
Hungarian novels
Novels set in Venice